Cyperus hainanensis is a species of sedge that is native to Hainan.

See also 
 List of Cyperus species

References 

hainanensis
Plants described in 2010
Flora of Hainan